Bessie is a historic, single ended riveted iron day boat, built in 1895 for the Hartshill Iron Company. It is now owned by the Black Country Living Museum, Dudley, West Midlands, England, where it is based.

These open "Joey" boats worked short distances carrying bulk cargoes such as coal and iron ore. Although most working boats at the time were wooden, larger firms used riveted iron boats like this one as though more expensive to build they lasted longer. From the 1930s Bessie was used by Stewarts & Lloyds tube works in Halesowen.

It is now owned by the Black Country Living Museum, where it is based and can be seen dockside in the Lord Ward's Canal Arm at the museum.

References

External links
Black Country Living Museum official website
National Historic Ships Register

Canal boats of the United Kingdom
Black Country Living Museum
Ships and vessels on the National Register of Historic Vessels
1895 ships